The Michigan Governor's Mansion and summer residence are located in the U.S. state of Michigan.

The primary residence is a gated mansion in a secured area of a private neighborhood of Lansing. The second home, a summer residence, is located on Mackinac Island.

Both residences are owned by the state of Michigan and are maintained with private donations.  The Michigan Constitution specifies that there is to be a governor's residence at the seat of government and that the seat of government shall be at Lansing.

Primary residence 
The governor's mansion in Lansing was built in 1957 for Howard and Letha Sober, who donated it to the state in 1969. The furnishings were provided by the State of Michigan. American architect Wallace Frost, who was known for traditional architecture, designed the ranch-style residence with its stone exterior in a contemporary style. The contemporary architecture was a change from his usual style. A garden room was added in the mid-1970's. The gated mansion sits on approximately four acres of secured area in the Moores River Drive estates of Lansing near the scenic Grand River.  Governors who have lived in the mansion during their office tenure include William Milliken, James Blanchard, John Engler, Jennifer Granholm, and current Governor Gretchen Whitmer. The mansion in Lansing was renovated during the early 2000s and contains , five bedrooms, and four baths. Governor Rick Snyder elected to remain at his Ann Arbor residence and used the official residence only for occasional ceremonial functions during his tenure from 2011 to 2019.

Summer residence

The Michigan Governor's Summer Residence on Mackinac Island is a three-story structure located on a bluff overlooking the Straits of Mackinac. It was originally built as a private residence for Chicago attorney Lawrence Andrew Young. In 1944, the Mackinac Island State Park Commission purchased the home for its original cost of $15,000. Since then, Michigan's governors have used this home to host important events with national and state leaders. The house was named to the National Register of Historic Places in 1997.

See also

Governor's Mansion (Marshall, Michigan)

References

External links 
"The Governors Residence Foundation" - State of Michigan

Governors' mansions in the United States
Houses on the National Register of Historic Places in Michigan
Government buildings on the National Register of Historic Places in Michigan
Houses completed in 1957
Houses in Ingham County, Michigan
National Register of Historic Places in Lansing, Michigan
Ranch house architecture
Governor of Michigan